

Events
 Dubsúilech Ó Maolconaire becomes Ollamh Síl Muireadaigh
 Bonifaci Calvo returns to Lombardy from Spain
 Rutebeuf writes Complainte du comte Eudes de Nevers, a lament for the death of Odo, Count of Nevers, defender of Acre

Births

Deaths
 Máeleoin Bódur Ó Maolconaire (born unknown), an Ollamh Síl Muireadaigh

References

13th-century poetry
Poetry